Giovanni Titta Rosa (5 March 1891 – 7 January 1972) was an Italian literary critic, poet, and novelist.

Born in Santa Maria del Ponte, at that time frazione of Fontecchio, Titta Rosa graduated in letters at the University of Florence and then started collaborating as a literary critic with a large number of publications, notably Lacerba, La Stampa, Il Secolo XIX, Il Resto del Carlino and Corriere della Sera.

Titta Rosa was also author of novels, essays and collections of poems. In 1931 he was awarded the Bagutta Prize for his collection of short stories Il varco nel muro.

References

 

1891 births
1972 deaths
People from the Province of L'Aquila
Italian male novelists
Italian essayists
Male essayists
Italian literary critics
Italian male poets
20th-century Italian male writers
University of Florence alumni
Italian male non-fiction writers
20th-century essayists
Tione degli Abruzzi